Paraburkholderia susongensis is a Gram-negative bacterium from the genus Paraburkholderia which has been isolated from a weathered rock surface in Susong in the Anhui Province in China.

References

External links
Type strain of Burkholderia susongensis at BacDive—the Bacterial Diversity Metadatabase

susongensis
Bacteria described in 2015